Green Island Cement is Hong Kong's only major cement producer. 

It is a wholly owned subsidiary of Cheung Kong Infrastructure Holdings.

History 
The company was founded in Ilha Verde (meaning "green island") in Macau in 1886 with British investment and was the first concrete manufacturer in the region. It relocated to Hok Un, Hong Kong in 1925 and became a British company shortly afterward. The company had been a major employer for many decades.

References

External links 

 GIC's website

Cement companies of Hong Kong
CK Hutchison Holdings
Former companies in the Hang Seng Index
Companies formerly listed on the Hong Kong Stock Exchange
1978 mergers and acquisitions
1988 mergers and acquisitions